Long Bình Tân is a ward located in Biên Hòa city of Đồng Nai province, Vietnam. It has an area of about 11.4km2 and the population in 2017 was 45,222.

References

Bien Hoa